Montbonnot-Saint-Martin is a commune in the Isère department in southeastern France. It is part of the Grenoble urban unit (agglomeration).

Population

Economy
Inovallée is a science park located at Montbonnot-Saint-Martin.

See also
Communes of the Isère department

References

Communes of Isère
Isère communes articles needing translation from French Wikipedia